Arthur Lewis Adey (1 March 1930 – January 1994) was a Scottish professional association football player of the 1950s.  Born in Glasgow, he was a centre forward and began his professional career with Doncaster Rovers and later played for Gillingham and Bradford Park Avenue. He made 68 appearances in The Football League and scored 15 goals.

Playing career
He signed for Doncaster Rovers in September 1950, following his move from Bishop Auckland and made his professional debut in Division Two on 14 April 1951 against Queens Park Rangers. In 1954, after three more seasons with the club, he moved to Gillingham, where he only made seven appearances, scoring one goal.  He next moved to Bradford Park Avenue, where he scored four times in thirteen appearances before drifting out of professional football.

He later went on to play for Bedford Town, Worcester City, Guildford City and Chelmsford City.

References

1930 births
1994 deaths
Scottish footballers
Footballers from Glasgow
Gillingham F.C. players
Doncaster Rovers F.C. players
Bradford (Park Avenue) A.F.C. players
Bedford Town F.C. players
Worcester City F.C. players
Guildford City F.C. players
Chelmsford City F.C. players
Bishop Auckland F.C. players
Association football forwards